Luigi Berzolari (1863–1945) was an Italian mathematician.

Life and work 
The son of an infantry officer, Berzolari studied at Pavia, under professor Salvatore Pincherle. From 1880 to 1884 he studied at the University of Pavia, where he graduated in mathematics. He subsequently taught at high schools in Pavia and Vigevano, keeping in touch with Pavia's university as an assistant docent. In 1888 he obtained the venia legendi, and in 1892 the university's venia legendi.

In 1893 he obtained the chair of projective geometry at University of Torino, from which he was transferred to the chair of algebraic analysis in the university of Pavia in 1899. He remained in that position until he retired in 1935, except during 1924-1925, when he taught at the University of Milano. In Pavia, he was dean of the faculty of sciences and the university's rector from 1909-1913 and 1920-1922.

He was president of the Unione Matematica Italiana and the Istituto Lombardo Accademia di Scienze e Lettere.

Berzolari is remembered as chief editor of the Enciclopedia delle matematiche elementari, a seven-volume encyclopedia devoted to mathematics, published between 1930 and 1953, edited by the Unione and which editorial direction was committed to Berzolari in 1909.

Bibliography

References

External links 
 
 
 

19th-century Italian people
19th-century Italian mathematicians
20th-century Italian mathematicians
1863 births
1949 deaths
Presidents of the Italian Mathematical Union